Vigouroux is a French surname. Notable people with the surname include:

Fulcran Vigouroux (1837–1915), French Catholic priest and scholar
Jacques Vigouroux Duplessis (c. 1680 – 1732), French painter
Lawrence Vigouroux (born 1993), Chilean football player
Paul Vigouroux (1919–1980), French political activist and Nazi collaborator
Pierre Vigouroux (born 1983), French rugby union player
Robert Vigouroux (1923–2017), French politician and writer

See also
Saint-Martin-sous-Vigouroux, a French commune

French-language surnames